Hennig Wichmann (died 1402) was one of the leaders of the German Likedeelers, an association of former Victual Brothers who had turned pirate.

Together with Klaus Störtebeker and Magister Wigbold, he wreaked havoc in the North and Baltic Sea at the end of the 14th century. They owned fast ships which were able to capture Hanseatic ships with ease. Their aim was plunder and surviving prisoners were usually thrown overboard.

In 1402, Wichmann was captured and executed by beheading on the Grasbrook in Hamburg together with 73 of his men, less than a year after the capture and execution of Klaus Störtebeker.

1402 deaths
14th-century German military personnel
15th-century executions
15th-century German military personnel
Executed German people
German pirates
Medieval pirates
People executed for piracy
People executed in the Holy Roman Empire by decapitation
Place of birth unknown
Year of birth unknown